Amandus (died 679) was a Christian bishop and saint.

Amandus may also refer to:

Amandus (fl. 285), co-leader with Aelianus (rebel) of a rebellion in Gaul
Amandus, also called Abantus, admiral of the Licinian fleet at the Battle of the Hellespont (324)
Saint Amandus of Strasbourg (died c. 355), first bishop of Strasbourg
Saint Amandus of Bordeaux (early 5th century), bishop and correspondent of Paulinus of Nola
Saint Amandus (6th century), hermit, teacher of Junian of Saint-Junien
Amandus (film), a 1966 Slovak film